The Sarasota Woman's Exchange is an organization in Sarasota, Florida. Founded in 1962, its subsequent expansion prompted several moves in its early years. It finally found a permanent home in 1969 after purchasing and renovating the Sarasota Herald Building.

It runs a consignment shop to raise money for community projects and grants. It is staffed by volunteers.

References

Buildings and structures in Sarasota, Florida
Woman's Exchange movement
Women in Florida